Halsey Street is a north-south street in Downtown Newark, New Jersey, which runs in between and parallel to Broad Street and Washington Street. It passes through the city's four historic districts: James Street Commons-Washington Park at the north, the abutting Military Park and Four Corners and, after a two block break, Lincoln Park at the south. Halsey and its side streets have long been the one of city's corridors for shopping, dining, and entertainment. Since the 2000s, the street has undergone a revival as new projects have generated renewed residential, cultural and commercial activities, including a restaurant row. The development has been supported with the city's 2008 Living Downtown master plan and is part of greater trend in creating a vibrant downtown.

History and description

Halsey Street lies within the original settlement of Newark which was laid out soon after its founding in 1666: the land was part of the plots distributed among the first settlers. It became a street during the early part of the 19th century during a period of great expansion. It is named for the William Halsey (1770–1843), who served as first Mayor of Newark (1836–1837) after reincorporation as a city.

North of Market Street, numerous row-houses from the earlier era are still found on Halsey and neighboring streets. 31 Central is home to an artists' collective and the LGBTQ Center. There are plans to replace it with a new residential and retail building. The stretch between Central and New Street has sited street festivals since 2010. Rutgers-Newark, whose campus begins in the neighborhood and lies to the west in University Heights, announced plans in 2017 for its Honors Living/Learning Center to be built at Halsey between New and Linden Streets. This is projected for completion in 2019.

During the city's Gilded Age, a boom period at the turn of the 20th century in the Roaring Twenties, many low-rise homes were replaced by new commercial buildings, including several department stores, such as Hahne and Company, Kresge-Newark, Bamberger's, S. Klein and Orbachs.

Ground was broken on the renovation of the Hahnes building in 2015, for adaptive reuse as educational, residential, and retail spaces. A six-story addition was built on the Halsey Street side, featuring close to 100 apartments and an underground parking garage. Rutgers opened a new arts and cultural center on three floors of the Halsey Street annex in 2017.  Called "Express Newark", it includes an 'arts incubator', media center, design consortium, print shop, portrait studio, and lecture hall, as well as exhibition and performance spaces. The project also includes a Whole Foods, Barnes & Noble, Petco, CitiMD Urgent Care, and a restaurant by celebrity chef Marcus Samuelsson called Marcus B & P. Halston Flats, a restored former industrial building at Raymond Boulevard converted to apartments with retail/restaurants on the ground floor, opened in 2017. The Kresge building, now home to Newark Public Schools, was once a stop on the Cedar Street Subway, part of Newark's extensive streetcar system. The S.Klein buildings was demolished to make way for a new tower that is part of Prudential Headquarters complex, which has been based in the district since the company's founding in the 19th century. The Bambergers building, now called 165 Halsey Street, has become an internet exchange point housing numerous computer systems including DE-CIX New York and Lexent Metro Connect.

The area south of Market Street, dubbed SoMa by developers, includes the Teachers Village neighbourhood. This area is undergoing development under a revitalization master plan design by Newark native Richard Meier, which in turn has stimulated other building and renovation projects. It is home to Hobby's, a landmark delicatessen luncheonette, and new restaurants, shops, and a planned Eataly-style food marketplace. For much of the 20th century, the neighborhood was an entertainment district, including cinemas and the venues The Key Club and Sparky J's. The Newark Female Charitable Society is a group of historic buildings on Halsey at Hill Street.

Halsey stops for two blocks, the street grid having been broken during a period of urban renewal along Nevada Street. It then continues into the Lincoln Park neighborhood, former home of the radio station WNSW and current home of the art gallery City Without Walls. This stretch of the street is more residential. Since the new millennium, many new multi-family apartment buildings have been constructed, including a project built using shipping containers and other housing developments that are "fully affordable". New two-family homes have been built on adjacent streets. Plans have been announced for the development of the Facade, an outdoor performance space, on the grounds of the South Park Calvary United Presbyterian Church. At its southern end is the Catedral Evangelica Reformada.

In June 2020, a stretch of the street was painted with All Black Lives Matter.

Gallery

See also
Ferry Street (Newark)
McCarter Highway
List of tallest buildings in Newark

References

External links

Halsey Street Bop

Culture of Newark, New Jersey
History of Newark, New Jersey
Transportation in Newark, New Jersey
Tourist attractions in Newark, New Jersey
Streets in Essex County, New Jersey